Takin al-Khassa Abu Mansur Takin ibn Abdallah al-Harbi al-Khazari (died 16 March 933) was an Abbasid commander of Khazar origin who served thrice as governor of Egypt.

He grew up and became an officer under Caliph al-Mu'tadid. He was appointed governor of Egypt in August 910, succeeding Isa al-Nushari, and remained in the post until 31 May 915, when he was deposed by Mu'nis al-Muzaffar due to his failure to contain the Fatimid invasion of the province, and replaced with Dhuka al-Rumi. 

He was re-appointed to the post in autumn 919, after the death of Dhuka, again in the midst of a second Fatimid invasion. He arrived at Fustat on 6 January 920. Once more, thanks to the intervention of an army under Mu'nis and a fleet under Thamal al-Dulafi, the Fatimid invasion was repulsed, with the last Fatimid troops abandoning the Fayyum Oasis and fleeing across the desert on 8 July 921. Takin was replaced on 22 July, but reinstated briefly a few days later.

His third and longest tenure began on March/April 924 and lasted until his own death on 16 March 933.

References

Sources 
 
 

9th-century births
933 deaths
10th-century Turkic people
10th-century Abbasid governors of Egypt